Compas is a Haitian musical genre.

Compas or COMPAS may also refer to:

Music
 Compás, metre and time signature in Spanish flamenco music
 Compas (album), a 1997 album by Gipsy Kings

Business
 COMPAS (software), software to predict criminal recidivism
 Grupo Compás, a Spanish petrochemical company
 Compas (polling company), a Canadian polling company

People
 Rob Compas (born 1966), Dutch cyclist
 Tanya Compas, British activist

Other
 Le Compas, a French commune
 Al Compás de tu Mentira, 1950 Argentine film
 Compas Pascal, an implementation of the Pascal programming language written by Anders Hejlsberg

Acronyms
 Cooperation Manufacturing Plant Aguascalientes, a joint venture automobile manufacturing plant owned by Nissan and Daimler AG
  Centre on Migration Policy and Society at the University of Oxford

See also 
 Compass (disambiguation)